Shanxi Normal University is a university in Linfen, Shanxi, China.

Shanxi Normal University has nearly 30,000 students on three campuses in Linfen, Shanxi, China. There are 22 departments and over 19,000 students majoring in economics, philosophy, the science of law, literature, history, science, engineering and others, with a total of 10 academic disciplines. The school celebrated its 60th anniversary in 2018.

History 
Shanxi Normal University is one of the five oldest universities in Shanxi Province. In 1958 Shanxi Normal University began as a teacher training school, responsible for training teachers throughout the south of Shanxi. After the regulation of the higher education system in 1962, it became the only higher-level teacher training school in the province. In 1964, through collaboration with various departments of Shanxi University it officially became Shanxi Teachers College. In 1984, it upgraded to a university through the endorsement of the State Education Commission of China. The Shanxi Provincial government decided in 1999 to make the Shanxi Normal University Sports College and the Shanxi Vocational Teachers College part of Shanxi Normal University.

In 2020 the university was criticized in Chinese media for refusing to provide a braille entrance exam for a prospective blind student.

Herbarium
The university has a herbarium with 20,000 specimens founded in 1963 and recognised in the Global Registry of Scientific Collections.

References

External links
 Shanxi Normal University webpage
English Website
Recent publications - ResearchGate

Teachers colleges in China
Universities and colleges in Shanxi